Anolis latifrons is a species of lizard in the family Dactyloidae. The species is found in Colombia and Panama.

References

Anoles
Reptiles described in 1846
Reptiles of Colombia
Reptiles of Panama
Taxa named by Arnold Adolph Berthold